Ashley Tara Tappin (born December 18, 1974), also known by her married name Ashley Doussan, is an American former competition swimmer and three-time Olympic champion.

Tappin was born in Marietta, Georgia, a suburb of Atlanta, Georgia. She attended St. Martin's Episcopal School in Metairie, Louisiana.

Tappin competed at the 1992 Olympic Games in Barcelona, Spain, where she earned a gold medal by swimming for the winning U.S. team in the preliminary heats of the women's 4×100-meter freestyle relay.

In the January 1996 issue of Swimming World, Tappin was featured on the cover with the caption 'Ashley Tappin University of Arizona's Sprint Free Champ'. She again was on the cover for the March 1999 issue with the headline 'Tappin's The Name: Winnin's The Game'. Inside that issue is an article on Tappin titled 'Tappin on the Door to Success' by Kari Lydersen with photos by Lori Adamski-Peek.

At the 2000 Olympic Games in Sydney, Australia, she received gold medals for swimming for the first-place U.S. teams in the preliminary heats of the women's 4×100-meter medley relay, and the women's 4×100-meter freestyle relay.

Tappin attended the University of Florida in Gainesville, Florida, where she swam for coach Mitch Ivey and coach Chris Martin's Florida Gators swimming and diving team in National Collegiate Athletic Association (NCAA) competition in 1993 and 1994. She won an NCAA championship in the 4×100-meter medley relay with teammates Janie Wagstaff, Shannon Price and Nicole Haislett in 1994. Subsequently, she transferred to the University of Arizona in Tucson, Arizona, where she swam for the Arizona Wildcats swimming and diving team, and won five more NCAA titles.

Tappin served as the head coach of the UNO Privateers swim team at the University of New Orleans in New Orleans, Louisiana, from 2004 to 2007.  She is a veteran celebrity swimmer for Swim Across America (SAA), a charitable organization that raises funds for cancer research, and she has participated in three SAA events in Boston, Massachusetts.

See also 

 List of multiple Olympic gold medalists
 List of Olympic medalists in swimming (women)
 List of University of Arizona people
 List of University of Florida Olympians

References

External links

1974 births
Living people
American female freestyle swimmers
Arizona Wildcats women's swimmers
Florida Gators women's swimmers
Olympic gold medalists for the United States in swimming
Sportspeople from Marietta, Georgia
Swimmers at the 1991 Pan American Games
Swimmers at the 1992 Summer Olympics
Swimmers at the 2000 Summer Olympics
Medalists at the 2000 Summer Olympics
Medalists at the 1992 Summer Olympics
Pan American Games gold medalists for the United States
Pan American Games medalists in swimming
Medalists at the 1991 Pan American Games